Dinakan (also Romanized as Dīnakān) is a Township in Derak town District, in the Central District of Shiraz County, Fars Province, Iran. At the 2006 census, its population was 2,515, in 682 families.

References 

Populated places in Shiraz County